Walking Through Fire is the twelfth studio album by the Canadian rock band April Wine, released in 1985 (see 1985 in music).  The album was apparently not released until 1986 in the band's native Canada.

Walking Through Fire was essentially a contractual obligation to the band's record label, to whom they still owed one album.  However, by this time, the band had technically already broken up, and the album features only Myles Goodwyn and Brian Greenway from April Wine's "classic line-up," augmented by three Montreal-based session musicians.  Perhaps unsurprisingly, the album is generally considered one of the band's weaker efforts, although the Goodwyn-penned track, "Love Has Remembered Me" was a minor hit and has become one of the band's best-known ballads.  The first single released from the album, a tune written by two members of Katrina and the Waves called "Rock Myself to Sleep" failed to make the charts.

The album itself peaked at number 174 on the U.S. album chart on October 12, 1985.

Track listing
All tracks written by Myles Goodwyn unless otherwise noted.
 "Rock Myself to Sleep" (Kimberley Rew, Vince De la Cruz) – 3:16
 "Wanted Dead or Alive" (Jeff Cannata, Michael Soldan) – 3:30
 "Beg for Your Love" (Eddie Schwartz) – 3:36
 "Love Has Remembered Me" – 4:07
 "Anejo" – 5:01
 "Open Soul Surgery" (Jim Vallance) – 3:41
 "You Don't Have to Act that Way" – 4:53
 "Hold On" – 3:48
 "All it Will Ever Be" – 4:39
 "Wait Any More" – 4:22

Personnel
 Myles Goodwyn – vocals, guitars
 Brian Greenway – vocals, guitars
 Jean Pellerin – bass
 Daniel Barbe – keyboards
 Marty Simon – drums

References

April Wine albums
1985 albums
1986 albums
Aquarius Records (Canada) albums
Capitol Records albums
Albums produced by Myles Goodwyn